is a Prefectural Natural Park in southwest Hokkaidō, Japan. Established in 1960, the park spans the municipalities of Esashi, Kaminokuni, Okushiri, Otobe, Setana, and Yakumo. Notable islands within the park include Okushiri Island and Kamome Island.

References

External links 
  Map of Natural Parks of Hokkaidō
  Map of Hiyama Prefectural Natural Park

Parks and gardens in Hokkaido
Protected areas established in 1960
1960 establishments in Japan